is a stratovolcano located west of Mount Bandai, close to Bandai town and Kitashiobara village in the Fukushima Prefecture, Japan. It is 1,403.6 metres high, and close to Lake Inawashiro and Oguni-numa Pond.

See also
List of volcanoes in Japan
List of mountains in Japan

External links 

 Nekomagatake - Geological Survey of Japan

Nekomadake
Nekomadake
Volcanoes of Fukushima Prefecture
Shugendō